Sankeshwar is a town located in Hukkeri taluka, Belagavi district, in Karnataka. It is located on AH47 (Previously National Highway 4). It is about 50 km north-east from Belgaum.  It is located on the bank of the Hiranyakeshi river
.

Geography 
It has an average elevation of 638  metres (2093 feet).

Demographics 
 India census, Sankeshwar had a population of 89,627. Males constitute 51% of the population and females 49%. Sankeshwar has an average literacy rate of 87%, higher than the national average of 59.5% (India): male literacy is 75%, and female literacy is 67%. 18% of the population is under 7 years of age. Kannada is the major language spoken here.

References 

Cities and towns in Belagavi district

bn:বেলগাউম
bpy:বেলগাউম
kn:ಸಂಕೇಶ್ವರ್
kn:ಬೆಳಗಾವಿ
ml:ബെൽഗാം
mr:बेळगावी
new:बेळगावी
pnb:بیلگاؤم
ro:Sankeshwar
war:Sankeshwar